Cézac is a commune in the Gironde department in Nouvelle-Aquitaine in southwestern France. It was first mentioned in documents in 1274.

Population

See also
Communes of the Gironde department

References

Communes of Gironde